Aore Island is an island in Sanma Province, Vanuatu.

Aore's climate is humid tropical. The island is subject to frequent cyclones and earthquakes.

The Aore language is spoken on the island.

Economy and tourism
Tourism and plantations are Aore Islands main providers of employment and economic revenue. There are numerous resorts on the island catering to tourists, weddings, and baptisms. Recreational fishing is a year-round activity.

Religion
The Seventh-day Adventist Church has been active on Aore Island since the early 20th century, and operates a co-educational boarding secondary school, Aore Adventist Academy, located on the mid-south coast of the island.

Youth With A Mission is a Christian organization (known commonly as YWAM) which runs a school for youth to be involved in Disciple Training Schools (DTS) or further training.  A DTS runs for about 6 months.  The first half is training and involves life changing teaching from teachers around the world.  The second half is outreach, so the students will leave Aore Island for another destination in the world and share their faith in God.  The base is found on the southwest side of Aore Island.

Large colonies of bats occupy the island's many caves.

References

Islands of Vanuatu
Sanma Province